The 2022 Richmond upon Thames London Borough Council election took place on 5 May 2022. All 54 members of Richmond upon Thames London Borough Council were elected. The elections took place alongside local elections in the other London boroughs and elections to local authorities across the United Kingdom.

In the previous election in 2018, the Liberal Democrats regained control of the council, winning 39 out of the 54 seats with the Conservative Party forming the principal opposition with eleven of the remaining fifteen seats. The 2022 election took place under new election boundaries, with the number of councillors remaining the same.

Background

History 

The thirty-two London boroughs were established in 1965 by the London Government Act 1963. They are the principal authorities in Greater London and have responsibilities including education, housing, planning, highways, social services, libraries, recreation, waste, environmental health and revenue collection. Some of the powers are shared with the Greater London Authority, which also manages passenger transport, police and fire.

Sinces its formation, Richmond upon Thames has been under Conservative control, Liberal Democrat control, SDP–Liberal Alliance control and no overall control. The Liberal Democrats regained control from the Conservatives in the most recent election in 2018. They won 39 seats with 46.7% of the vote across the borough while the Conservatives won 11 seats with 37.6% of the vote and the Greens won 4.5% of the vote. The Labour Party won 10.4% of the vote but did not win any seats. The leader of the LIberal Democrat group, Gareth Roberts, became council leader following the election.

Council term 

In 2019, Mona Adams, the Liberal Democrat councillor for East Sheen, died. A by-election was held to fill her seat on 19 July 2019, which was won by the Liberal Democrat candidate Julia Cambridge. Cambridge was a designer who had unsuccessfully contested the seat alongside Adams in the 2018 election. In July 2020, Dylan Bexendale, the Green Party councillor for Hampton Wick, resigned citing personal reasons. Due to the COVID-19 pandemic, a by-election to fill his seat could not be held until 6 May 2021 alongside the 2021 London mayoral election and London Assembly election. The election was won by the Liberal Democrat candidate Petra Fleming.

As with most London boroughs, Richmond upon Thames was electing its councillors under new boundaries decided by the Local Government Boundary Commission for England, which it produced after a period of consultation. The number of councillors remained at 54, but the commission produced new boundaries following a period of consultation, with eighteen three-member wards.

Electoral process 
Richmond upon Thames, like other London borough councils, elects all of its councillors at once every four years. The previous election took place in 2018. The election took place by multi-member first-past-the-post voting, with each ward being represented by two or three councillors. Electors had as many votes as there are councillors to be elected in their ward, with the top two or three being elected.

All registered electors (British, Irish, Commonwealth and European Union citizens) living in London aged 18 or over were entitled to vote in the election. People who live at two addresses in different councils, such as university students with different term-time and holiday addresses, were entitled to be registered for and vote in elections in both local authorities. Voting in-person at polling stations took place from 7:00 to 22:00 on election day, and voters will be able to apply for postal votes or proxy votes in advance of the election.

Previous council composition

Summary of results

Ward Results 

Candidates seeking re-election are marked with an asterisk (*). Councillors seeking re-election for a different ward are marked with a cross (†).

Barnes

East Sheen

Fulwell & Hampton Hill

Ham, Petersham & Richmond Riverside

Hampton

Hampton North

Hampton Wick & South Teddington

Heathfield

Kew

Mortlake & Barnes Common

North Richmond

South Richmond

South Twickenham

St Margarets & North Twickenham

Teddington

Twickenham Riverside

West Twickenham

Whitton

References 

Council elections in the London Borough of Richmond upon Thames
Richmond upon Thames